Karim Zéribi (born 25 September 1966) is a French politician of Europe Ecology – The Greens, Member of the European Parliament.

Zéribi was born in Avignon, France, and succeeded socialist politician Vincent Peillon as representative for the South-East constituency. Zéribi changed parties to EELV in 2010. Two of his three Algerian grandparents are of Kabyle origin and one grandparent is French.

Judicial inquiry
Karim Zéribi is suspected to have embezzled 50,000 euros of subsidies. He was placed in police custody on 8 April 2015.

References

1966 births
Living people
Politicians from Avignon
Europe Ecology – The Greens politicians
Europe Ecology – The Greens MEPs
MEPs for France 2009–2014
French people of Kabyle descent
MEPs for South-East France 2009–2014